Mountain skink may refer to:

 Chalcides montanus from Morocco
 Liopholis montana from continental Australia
 Plestiodon callicephalus from Arizona, New Mexico, and north-western Mexico
 Eutropis clivicola from India
 Niveoscincus orocryptus from Tasmania

Animal common name disambiguation pages